According to classes and categories of public roads in Poland, a national road is a public trunk road controlled by the Polish central government authority, the General Directorship of National Roads and Motorways. Other types of roads in Poland are under the control of entities at voivodeship, powiat and gmina levels: voivodeship roads, powiat roads and gmina roads.

National roads network

National roads include:
 motorways and expressways and other roads that are planned to be upgraded to motorways or expressways
 International E-road network
 roads connecting the national road network
 roads to or from border crossings
 roads which are alternatives to toll roads
 beltways of major cities and metropolitan areas
 roads of military importance

Currently there are 96 national roads in Poland (1–68, 70–97). Since 1 January 2014, there are new national roads: 89, 95, 96 and 97. According to national roads state report of 2008 by GDDKiA 1/4 of national roads are capable of handling 11,5 tonnes per axle loads. Due to new regulation of General Director of National Roads and Motorways in August 2016 there is no longer national road 69. In January 2020, national road 98 was downgraded and removed from the national roads network.

List of national roads 
Polish national roads network consist of following roads, as of December 27, 2022:

See also 
 Highways in Poland
 Transport in Poland

References

External links 

 Map of national roads in Poland (GDDKiA)

 
 N
National roads
Poland, National
Roads